is a Japanese aristocratic kin group. The family is a branch of Hokke and, by extension, a main branch of the Fujiwara clan.

History
The family claims descent from Fujiwara no Kanezane, third son of Fujiwara no Tadamichi. After the fall of the Taira clan in 1185, Kanezane became Sesshō and Kampaku with the support from Minamoto no Yoritomo; Kanezane then founded an independent family as of 1191, and the family name Kujō was named after a residence located on the road "Kujō-Ōji" (九条大路), where his family lived, built by his ancestor, Fujiwara no Mototsune. Since then, the Kujō became one of the five Fujiwara families from which the Sesshō and Kampaku could be chosen, later known as Five regent houses. The fourth and fifth shōgun of the Kamakura shogunate, Kujō Yoritsune and Kujō Yoritsugu, came from this family as well.

After the Meiji Restoration, members of the Kujō clan were elevated to princedom and given the title Prince.

Family Tree

Tsurudono family
The  was founded by the fifth son of Kujō Hisatada, Tsurudono Tadayoshi (1853-1895), in 1888. The kanji used in the family name was originally "靏殿" but later changed to "鶴殿", both names are pronounced "Tsurudono".

 Tsurudono Tadayoshi (1853-1895), becoming baron since December 18, 1889 until his death.
  (1891-1956), son of Tadayoshi, succeeding baron, after his father's death, in 1895–1947.
 Tsurudono Sumiie (b. 1924), son of Iekatsu, and he has three sons.

See also
 Japanese clans
 List of Kuge families
 Five regent houses

References 

 
Japanese clans
Fujiwara clan